Leucochitonea hindei is a butterfly in the family Hesperiidae. It is found in Ethiopia and Kenya.

References

Butterflies described in 1903
Tagiadini
Butterflies of Africa